In 1893 Giuseppe Lauricella defined and studied four hypergeometric series FA, FB, FC, FD of three variables. They are :

for |x1| + |x2| + |x3| < 1 and

for |x1| < 1, |x2| < 1, |x3| < 1 and

for |x1|½ + |x2|½ + |x3|½ < 1 and

for |x1| < 1, |x2| < 1, |x3| < 1. Here the Pochhammer symbol (q)i indicates the i-th rising factorial of q, i.e.

where the second equality is true for all complex  except .
               
These functions can be extended to other values of the variables x1, x2, x3 by means of analytic continuation.

Lauricella also indicated the existence of ten other hypergeometric functions of three variables. These were named FE, FF, ..., FT and studied by Shanti Saran in 1954 . There are therefore a total of 14 Lauricella–Saran hypergeometric functions.

Generalization to n variables

These functions can be straightforwardly extended to n variables. One writes for example

where |x1| + ... + |xn| < 1. These generalized series too are sometimes referred to as Lauricella functions.

When n = 2, the Lauricella functions correspond to the Appell hypergeometric series of two variables:

When n = 1, all four functions reduce to the Gauss hypergeometric function:

Integral representation of FD

In analogy with Appell's function F1, Lauricella's FD can be written as a one-dimensional Euler-type integral for any number n of variables:

This representation can be easily verified by means of Taylor expansion of the integrand, followed by termwise integration. The representation implies that the incomplete elliptic integral Π is a special case of Lauricella's function FD with three variables:

Finite-sum solutions of FD

Case 1 : ,  a positive integer

One can relate FD to the Carlson R function  via

with the iterative sum

 and 

where it can be exploited that the Carlson R function with  has an exact representation (see  for more information).

The vectors are defined as

Case 2: ,  a positive integer

In this case there is also a known analytic form, but it is rather complicated to write down and involves several steps.
See  for more information.

References

  (see p. 114)
 
 
  (corrigendum 1956 in Ganita 7, p. 65)
  (there is a 2008 paperback with )
  (there is another edition with )

 

Hypergeometric functions
Mathematical series